Kinnickinnic River may refer to one of two rivers in the U.S. state of Wisconsin:

 Kinnickinnic River (Milwaukee River tributary) in southeastern Wisconsin
 Kinnickinnic River (St. Croix River tributary) in northwestern Wisconsin

See also 
 Kinnikinnick (disambiguation)